Radical 147 or radical see meaning "see" is one of the 20 Kangxi radicals (214 radicals in total) composed of 7 strokes.

In the Kangxi Dictionary, there are 161 characters (out of 49,030) to be found under this radical.

The simplified form of this radical character consists of 4 strokes.

Evolution

Derived characters

Literature

See also

Unihan Database - U+898B

147
078